In coordination chemistry and crystallography, the geometry index or structural parameter is a number ranging from 0 to 1 that indicates what the geometry of the coordination center is. The first such parameter for 5-coordinate compounds was developed in 1984. Later, parameters for 4-coordinate compounds were developed.

5-coordinate compounds

where:  are the two greatest valence angles of the coordination center.

When  is close to 0 the geometry is similar to square pyramidal, while if  is close to 1 the geometry is similar to trigonal bipyramidal:

4-coordinate compounds

In 2007 Houser et al. developed the analogous  parameter to distinguish whether the geometry of the coordination center is square planar or tetrahedral. The formula is:

When  is close to 0 the geometry is similar to square planar, while if  is close to 1 then the geometry is similar to tetrahedral. However, in contrast to the  parameter, this does not distinguish  and  angles, so structures of significantly different geometries can have similar  values. To overcome this issue, in 2015 Okuniewski et al. developed parameter  that adopts values similar to  but better differentiates the examined structures:

where:  are the two greatest valence angles of coordination center;  is a tetrahedral angle.

If for tetrahedral complex the value of  parameter is low, then one should check if there are some additional interactions within coordination sphere. For example, in complexes of mercury(II), the Hg···π interactions were found this way.

References

Crystallography
Chemistry
Chemical structures

Read More
A web application for determining molecular geometry indices on the basis of 3D structural files can be found here.